Tolethorpe Road Verges is a one hectare biological Site of Special Scientific Interest along the verges of Ryall Road between Great Casterton and Ryhall in Rutland.

These grass road verges on Jurassic limestone have several regionally uncommon plants. They are dominated by tor-grass and upright brome, and there are calcareous grassland herbs such as  spiny restharrow and  stemless thistle.

References

Sites of Special Scientific Interest in Rutland